Emma Steinbakken (born 10 March 2003) is a Norwegian singer from Jessheim. She has released the songs "Not Gonna Cry" (2019) and "Without You". She performed on Swedish and Norwegian television as a guest on Fredrik Skavlan's talk show Skavlan in 2019.

Discography

Singles

References

Living people
2003 births
21st-century Norwegian women singers
21st-century Norwegian singers